Dalarna is a landskap (historical province) in central Sweden. English exonyms for it are Dalecarlia and the Dales.

Dalarna adjoins Härjedalen, Hälsingland, Gästrikland, Västmanland and Värmland. It is also bordered by Norway in the west. The province's borders mostly coincide with the modern administrative Dalarna County (län).

The word "Dalarna" means "the dales" (valleys). The area is a holiday destination for Swedes from the south, who often travel there in the summer, drawn by its fishing lakes, campgrounds, and forests. Some Swedes own or rent a second home in Dalarna, where they are likely to have a vegetable garden and apple trees. In mid-June, midsummer celebrations and dances are held in many of the small villages and in the larger cities. Dalarna is a region full of historical associations, and both its products and its people have strong local characteristics. In the western district Lima, some people in villages speak a traditional dialect, Dalecarlian, while in Älvdalen, they speak Elfdalian, a dialect as foreign as Norwegian or Danish. Historically, the people of Dalecarlia – called Dalecarlians, or Dalesmen (dalkarlar, masar) and Daleswomen (kullor) – have been famous for their independent nature toward authority.

The Old Norse form of the province name is Járnberaland, which means "the land of the iron carriers."

Dalarna is roughly the size of the whole of Jutland (Denmark).

Administration 
The provinces of Sweden serve no administrative or political purposes, but function as historical and cultural entities. In the case of Dalarna a corresponding administrative Dalarna County has almost, but not exactly, the same boundaries as the province, except for a part of the northeast (Hamra parish, also known as Orsa Finnmark) which forms part of Ljusdal Municipality, Gävleborg County.

Heraldry 
Dalarna's coat of arms dates from 1560; the use of two crossed arrows as a symbol precedes this. A Duchy of Dalecarlia also exists, and the provincial arms include a ducal coronet.

Blazon: "Azure, two Dalecarlian Arrows Or in saltire point upwards pointed Argent and in chief a Crown of the first".

As early as 1525, the arrows appeared in use on a seal. Dalarna County uses the same coat of arms, granted for the then Kopparberg County in 1936.

Geography 
The northern part of the province is dominated by mountains and the vast Orsa Finnmark area. The southern part of the province is part of the Bergslagen region, and consists mostly of plains, hills and forested areas. There are several copper mines in the southern part, most notorious of which being the Falun Mine. The highest point is Storvätteshågna, at 1,204 meters above sea level. The lowest point is in the southeast, at 55 meters above sea level.

Dalarna's largest lake is lake Siljan, in the middle part of Dalarna. There the Västerdal River and Österdal River join the Dal River. Dalarna's second largest lake is Runn, which lies between Falun and Borlänge. With  of water and over 50 islands, the lake is a tourist destination.

Cities
Dalarna was historically divided into chartered cities and districts:

Avesta (1641–1686, renewed 1919)
Borlänge (1944, as Borlængio by 1390)
Falun (1641)
Hedemora (approximately 1400)
Ludvika (1919)
Säter (1642)
Mora

Since 1971, the cities are seats of their respective municipalities.

Other towns
Vansbro
Leksand
Orsa
Älvdalen
Rättvik
Tällberg
Malung
Sälen
Särna (and Idre)
Smedjebacken
Gagnef

National parks
Färnebofjärden
Fulufjället
Hamra
Töfsingdalen

History 
The province of Dalarna formed part of Svealand before the formation of Sweden in the 11th century.

Three historically notorious rebellions started in the Dalarna province:

 In 1434, led by Engelbrekt Engelbrektsson, the miners rose against the oppression of the officers of Eric of Pomerania.
 In 1519–1523 Gustav Vasa found his first and staunchest supporters among the miners in his revolt against the Kalmar Union under King Christian II.
 In 1524–1533 the Dalecarlians and local nobles rebelled against Gustav's increasingly autocratic rule and reformist religious policies; three uprisings were brutally suppressed. Some of the leaders were executed as alleged collaborators of King Christian during the liberation war.
 In 1743, the Dalecarlian Rebellion against the Hats, which was the last major peasants' uprising in Sweden.

Culture 

Historically, Dalarna has enjoyed a rich and unique folk culture, with distinct music, paintings, and handicrafts. The province preserved longer than any other the use of the Runic alphabet, a local dialect of which, the so-called Dalecarlian runes or Dalrunes, survived into the 19th century.

A symbol of the province is the Dalecarlian horse, in Swedish Dalahäst, a painted and decorated wooden horse. Sulky racing is common in the region. The high level of calcium in the soil favours horse breeding.

UNESCO has named the mining area of the Stora Kopparberg ("Great Copper Mountain") in Falun a World Heritage Site.

Notable natives 
Lars "Kuprik" Bäckman, chef
Jussi Björling, opera singer
Cryonic Temple, heavy metal band
Joacim Cans, musician
Björn Dixgård, musician
Johan Erik Forsström, naturalist
Lars Frölander, swimmer
Amanda Hollingby Matsson, singer
Hypocrisy (band), death metal band
Emil Janel, Swedish-American artist
Sixten Jernberg, skier
Anders Kallur, ice hockey player
Jenny Kallur, sprinter
Sanna Kallur, sprinter
Nils Karlsson ("Mora-Nisse"), skier
Patrick Johansson, musician
Carl Larsson, painter
Gustaf de Laval, inventor and engineer
Nicklas Lidström, ice hockey player
Mando Diao, alternative rock band
Kristian Matsson ("The Tallest Man on Earth"), folk musician
Kalle Moraeus, musician
Gunnar Myrdal, economist and politician
Gustaf Norén, musician
Charlie Norman, pianist
Pain, industrial metal band
Karin Park, pop star
Tony Rickardsson, speedway rider
Birgit Ridderstedt, folk singer
Sabaton (band), power metal band
Sator, rock band
Scar Symmetry, death metal band
Björn Skifs, entertainer
Gunde Svan, cross-country skier, television presenter
Peter Tägtgren, musician
Anders Zorn, painter
Peter Moren, pop singer, and member of the indie/pop-rock band Peter, Bjorn and John

Districts
The Swedish provinces were subdivided into the Hundreds of Sweden, in effect until the early 20th century.

In some provinces, the sub-dividing was through districts. Dalarna had only one chartered hundred; the others were court districts.

Folkare Hundred
Grangärde Court District
Hedemora and Garpenberg Court District
Husby Court District
Kopparberg and Aspeboda Court District
Leksand Court District
Malung Court District
Mora Court District
Norrbärke Court District
Nås Court District
Orsa Court District
Rättvik Court District
Skedvi Grand Court District
Sundborn Court District
Sveg Court District
Svärdsjö Court District
Särna Court District
Söderbärke Court District
Torsång Court District
Tuna Grand Court District
Vika Court District
Älvdalen Court District

Sports
Skiing is popular in Dalarna. Vasaloppet, a cross-country skiing race (the world's longest) of 90 km, takes place annually, usually on the first Sunday of March, between Sälen and Mora. It commemorates the ski-borne escape of Gustav Ericson, who would later become King Gustav I of Sweden, from Danish troops in 1520.

Football in the province is administered by Dalarnas Fotbollförbund. Brage and Dalkurd are examples of football teams in Dalarna. Ice hockey is also popular in Dalarna. The two ice hockey teams and rivals from Dalarna are Leksands IF and Mora IK, both frequently in the highest ice hockey division.

Notes

References 

 article Dalarna from Nordisk familjebok.

External links

 Dalarna tourist site
 Pictures from Dalarna

 
Provinces of Sweden